Hans Matthiae (22 December 1884 – 21 November 1948) was a Germany rower who competed in the 1912 Summer Olympics. He was the strokeman of the German boat, which won the bronze medal in the eights.

1912 German Men's eights rowing team
Otto Liebing
Max Bröske
Fritz Bartholomae
Willi Bartholomae
Werner Dehn
Rudolf Reichelt
Hans Matthiae
Kurt Runge
Max Vetter

References

External links
profile

1884 births
1948 deaths
Rowers at the 1912 Summer Olympics
Olympic rowers of Germany
Olympic bronze medalists for Germany
Olympic medalists in rowing
German male rowers
Medalists at the 1912 Summer Olympics